Ronald Dean Bell is a Canadian lawyer, specializing in petroleum tax issues. He has written extensively for professional journals, and has lectured throughout North America and Europe on tax issues.

Bell was born in Deloraine, Manitoba. He graduated from Brandon College with a Bachelor of Arts in 1951 and obtained a law degree from the University of Manitoba in 1955. From 1955 to 1959, he worked as a solicitor for Canada's Department of National Revenue, Taxation Division and later became a partner in Fenerty & Co, a Calgary law firm. In 1978, he was appointed to the Queen’s Privy Council. In 1978, he formed Bell Felesky Flynn, a law practice focusing on taxation. Bell was the Chancellor of Brandon University from 1990 to 1996. In 1991, he was appointed Judge of the Tax Court of Canada. Brandon University honoured him on January 24, 2002, by inducting him into the Brandon University Hall of Fame.

References 

Lawyers in Manitoba
Judges of the Tax Court of Canada
People from Deloraine, Manitoba
Brandon University alumni
University of Manitoba alumni
Living people
Robson Hall alumni
1932 births